Johanna Ochieng Omolo (born 31 July 1989) is a Kenyan professional footballer who plays for the Belgian club URSL Visé as a defensive midfielder.

Club career
Born in Nairobi, Omolo has played club football in Kenya, Belgium and Luxembourg for Coast Stars, Visé, Fola Esch, Beerschot, Lommel United and Antwerp. After playing for Cercle Brugge, he signed for Turkish club BB Erzurumspor in January 2021.

International career
Omolo received his first call-up to the Kenyan national team in September 2010, making his debut for his country in 2011.

Omolo represented the national team at the 2019 Africa Cup of Nations and scored a goal against Tanzania, which helped the team win 3–2, but the result was Kenya could not leave the group.

International goals
Scores and results list Kenya's goal tally first.

References

1988 births
Footballers from Nairobi
Living people
Kenyan footballers
Kenya international footballers
Association football midfielders
Coast Stars F.C. players
C.S. Visé players
CS Fola Esch players
Beerschot A.C. players
Lommel S.K. players
Royal Antwerp F.C. players
Cercle Brugge K.S.V. players
Büyükşehir Belediye Erzurumspor footballers
Kocaelispor footballers
URSL Visé players
Belgian Pro League players
Challenger Pro League players
Luxembourg National Division players
Süper Lig players
TFF First League players
Belgian National Division 1 players
2019 Africa Cup of Nations players
Kenyan expatriate footballers
Kenyan expatriate sportspeople in Belgium
Expatriate footballers in Belgium
Kenyan expatriate sportspeople in Luxembourg
Expatriate footballers in Luxembourg
Kenyan expatriate sportspeople in Turkey
Expatriate footballers in Turkey